Mauricio Alberto "Chicho" Serna Valencia (born 22 January 1968) is a Colombian former professional footballer who played 51 games for the Colombia national team between 1993 and 2001

Chicho Serna played for a number of clubs, including Deportivo Pereira, Atlético Nacional, Boca Juniors (Argentina), Puebla F.C. (Mexico), Chacarita Juniors (Argentina) and Talleres Córdoba (Argentina). He was often cheered by Boca's fans with "Chicho, Chicho, Chicho. Huevo, Huevo, Huevo", referring to his compelling style of play.

Career
Serna was born in Medellín. At Boca, he played 96 league games, scoring two goals. He played a total of 123 games for the club in all competitions.

Serna played for the Colombia national team and was a participant at the 1994 FIFA World Cup and at the 1998 FIFA World Cup.

After retirement
In February 2021, Serna was hired in a role at Boca Juniors, as a link between the Soccer Council and the coaches of the clubs youth department.

On 17 August 2021, Boca's reserve team manager, Sebastián Battaglia, was appointed first team manager on interim basis, while Serna and Hugo Ibarra took charge of the reserve team, also on interim basis.

Personal life
On 5 May 2015, he was publicly accused in his native Colombia on the Séptimo día television program, of defrauding an innumerable number of young soccer players with the promise that they had been signed by Argentine clubs, making them travel to the country asking them in advance a commission for the supposed signings.

On 5 June 2018, a court in Buenos Aires linked him to the crimes of drug trafficking and money laundering in Argentina for a figure close to three million dollars.

Also in 2019, he was accused before a United States court by the drug trafficker José Bayron Piedrahíta, better known by his aliases of (El Árabe or El Patrón de Caucasia ); of having committed the crime of money laundering together with Pablo Escobar's widow and son through real estate deals in Argentina and Panama.

Honours
Atlético Nacional
 Categoría Primera A: 1994

Boca Juniors
 Argentine Primera División: Apertura 1998, Clausura 1999, Apertura 2000
 Copa Libertadores: 2000, 2001
 Copa Intercontinental: 2000

References

External links
 Argentine Primera statistics at Fútbol XXI  
 

1968 births
Living people
Footballers from Medellín
Colombian footballers
Association football midfielders
Colombia international footballers
1994 FIFA World Cup players
1998 FIFA World Cup players
Atlético Nacional footballers
Deportivo Pereira footballers
Boca Juniors footballers
Chacarita Juniors footballers
Talleres de Córdoba footballers
Club Puebla players
Categoría Primera A players
Argentine Primera División players
Liga MX players
Colombian expatriate footballers
Colombian expatriate sportspeople in Argentina
Expatriate footballers in Argentina
Colombian expatriate sportspeople in Mexico
Expatriate footballers in Mexico